John Cairney (born 1957) is a Scottish film and television actor.

John Cairney may also refer to:
John Cairney (anatomist) (1898–1966), New Zealand anatomist, medical superintendent and writer
John Cairney (mycologist) (1959–2012), Scottish–Australian mycologist